Półkozic is a Polish coat of arms. It was used by several szlachta families in the times of the Polish–Lithuanian Commonwealth.

History
According to legend, this coat was assigned to knight Stawisz, who was defending the foreign castle of Etecz (or Eczech) against the pagans. When besieged, he ordered to kill a goat and a donkey, and then use their blood to paint ox's hide. With this hide he then ordered to decorate the walls of the castle. The pagans, seeing that defenders had so much meat as to waste it, lifted the siege and left. The knight was rewarded by the king Bolesław I Chrobry with a coat of arms and returned to Poland.

The bearers of the coat were mentioned since early Piast era. Initially they were tied to the land of Lesser Poland, (regions of Sandomierz and Kraków), regions near Lublin, Rawa Mazowiecka, Sieradz and then Red Ruthenia. After the Union of Horodło bearers of the coat of arms appeared also in Lithuania.

Blazon
Gules, donkeys head gardant Argent. Over the helm the crest composed of a goat passant proper Argent.

Notable bearers
Notable bearers of this coat of arms include:

 House of Ligęza
 Jan son of Pakosław (owner of Rzeszów)- a valued diplomat of king Casimir III in many diplomatic missions including mission to pope Urban V
 Marcin of Wrocimowice - Standard-Bearer of the Territory of Kraków in the Battle of Grunwald
 Michał from Czyżowo -  member of Royal council of Władysław II Jagiełło.
 The fictional family of Horeszko from the epic poem Pan Tadeusz by Adam Mickiewicz were bearers of Półkozic Coat of Arms.
 Mikołaj Wolski
 Baron Grunwald family, one out of two brothers Ligęza who purchased and owned the Grunwald village Battle of Grunwald where the Battle stand. He liked the village name so much so he changed his name after the village. Standard bearer of own regiment size force at the Battle. The last Baron Grunwald died in Warszawa 1981, ending his House.

Gallery

See also
 Półkozic
 Polish heraldry
 Heraldry
 Coat of Arms

Bibliography
 Alfred Znamierowski: Herbarz rodowy. Warszawa: Świat Książki, 2004, s. 151. .
 Tadeusz Gajl: Herbarz polski od średniowiecza do XX wieku : ponad 4500 herbów szlacheckich 37 tysięcy nazwisk 55 tysięcy rodów. L&L, 2007. .

External links
  Polkozic Coat of Arms and bearers. 
 pdf  pp. 8-13
 Żenkiewicz

Polish coats of arms